Strawberry hedgehog cactus is a common name for several cacti and may refer to:

Echinocereus engelmannii, native to the southwestern United States and Mexico
Echinocereus stramineus